Yuraktau (Yöräktaw) is a rural locality (a village) in Alataninsky Selsoviet, Sterlitamaksky District, Bashkortostan, Russia. The population was 221 as of 2010. There are 5 streets.

Geography 
Yuraktau is located 28 km northeast of Sterlitamak (the district's administrative centre) by road. Nikolayevka is the nearest rural locality.

References 

Rural localities in Sterlitamaksky District